The Cathay Landmark is a skyscraper located in Xinyi Special District, Xinyi District, Taipei, Taiwan. It is the eighth tallest building in Taiwan and the fourth tallest in Xinyi Special District. The height of the building is 212 m, the floor area is 152,488.6m2, and it comprises 46 floors above ground as well as 6 basement levels. The building was designed by Kris Yao.

See also 
 Taipei 101
 Shin Kong Life Tower
 85 Sky Tower
 List of tallest buildings in Taiwan
 Xinyi Special District

References 

2015 establishments in Taiwan
Buildings and structures in Taipei
Office buildings completed in 2015
Xinyi Special District
Skyscraper office buildings in Taipei
Shopping malls in Taipei